Carrie Murray Nature Center (CMNC) is operated by Baltimore City Recreation and Parks. CMNC offers environmental education programs for children, families, and adults as Baltimore City's only nature center. A native live animal collection, outdoor bird aviary, and indoor exhibits are features of the center, which is nestled in the expansive and historic Gwynns Falls/Leakin Park, the largest urban forested park east of the Mississippi River.

The nature center serves an estimated 30,000 visitors annually, including individuals and families as well as groups from schools, faith-based groups, recreation centers, and camps. During the school year, the nature center offers field trips and outreach programs for students of all ages, including the Wild Haven forest immersion program for preschool-age children. They also offer summer camps, public programs, special events, and volunteer opportunities.

Background 
Baltimore City Recreation and Parks (BCRP) established the nature center after receiving a generous donation from former Baltimore Orioles  baseball hall-of-famer Eddie Murray. The center was dedicated in 1985 and was named after Eddie's mother, Carrie Murray. Ms. Murray’s gentle spirit and strength of character greatly influenced her twelve children. She instilled in them the importance of family, respect for nature and a sense of responsibility, leadership, and accomplishment.

The nature center hopes that the values by which Ms. Murray lived her life will inspire others to fulfill her mission to care for nature and each other.

Programs

Outdoor Discovery 
Children are guided to use their senses, hone motor skills, and notice the multi-faceted natural world around them. The afternoon sessions include hiking, inquiry, exploration, and nature-themed art and activities. In addition, children will meet the nature center's live animal ambassadors.

School field trips 
The nature center offers a range of school field trips that promote science, natural history, environmental education, and STEAM-based approaches to curriculum. The trips encompass outdoor learning, hiking, and exploration in Gwynns Falls Leakin Park

Schoolyard visits 
In lieu of a field trip, outreach programs offer a convenient way to meet live animals, participate in group activities, and discover nature in your schoolyard. Science inquiry includes identification of plants, invertebrates, and other wildlife during outdoor games and a scavenger hunt.

Weekend programs 
Nature discovery and a variety of free or low cost guided programs for all ages happen every Saturday.

Animal encounters 
Children can interact with live animals from the nature center's collection during an engaging visit with a naturalist. Participants will have hands-on experiences with artifacts and learn how scientists classify various animals based on their physical and behavioral adaptations.

Summer nature camp 
Summer camps allow children to get outdoors and explore. They will search for native birds, insects, and animals in the forest, and discover fish and other creatures in the stream. They will enjoy the shade of the trees and discover insects in the meadow. Nature arts and crafts are part of the fun.

Wild Haven Forest Immersion pre-school and childcare 
Wild Haven was created to help young children, families, and teachers draw closer to the natural world. Children have a right to learn and play outdoors. Nature-based learning has immense benefits that are available to all children regardless of where they live. Baltimore City Recreation and Parks (BCRP) has an extensive network of parks throughout the city, just waiting to be discovered. A Wild Haven pilot program was launched at Carrie Murray Nature Center in February, 2018 and expanded to childcare in 2020.

Master Naturalist Program 
The Certified Maryland Master Naturalist Program is offered as an Extension of the University of Maryland. The Nature Center is a host site for the program and provides sixty hours of instruction and immersive outdoor experiences. Participants will hike, observe wildlife, and learn with seasoned instructors to hone naturalist skills based in the Piedmont region of Gwynns Falls/Leakin Park. Following completion of the course, Master Naturalists are required to serve at their host site for forty hours per year. For more information about this course, visit the University of Maryland's Master Naturalist Extension page.

High school volunteer opportunities 
Every first Saturday of the month, students are invited to earn service hours by working on projects at the nature center. The nature center offers on-going individual projects as well as larger projects for groups. Students can also create their own projects based on service learning objectives set by their school. After service hours are completed, the nature center conducts exit interviews which include individual conversations and time for reflection.

Partners 
The nature center works closely with their partners to amplify there presence and share the wonder of the natural world with Baltimore residents and beyond.

 Friends of Carrie Murray Nature Center
 Friends of Gwynns Falls Leakin Park
 National Aquarium
 Parks & People Foundation
 Baltimore City Public Schools
 National Park Service
 National Park Foundation
 Maryland Public Television 
 National Wildlife Federation
 Maryland Department of Natural Resources
 Boy Scouts of America
 University of Maryland Extension Master Naturalists
 ERAFANS
 Phoenix Wildlife Center
 Frisky's Wildlife Sanctuary
 Lights Out Baltimore
 Enoch Pratt Free Library

References

External links

Buildings and structures in Baltimore
Nature centers in Maryland
Culture of Baltimore
Tourist attractions in Baltimore